Dasyerges is a genus of moths of the family Noctuidae. The genus was erected by Max Wilhelm Karl Draudt in 1950.

Species
Dasyerges perseverans Hreblay & Ronkay, 1998 Nepal
Dasyerges poliastis Draudt, 1950 Yunnan

References

Cuculliinae